Gan Or (lit. Garden of Light) was an Israeli settlement located in the Gush Katif settlement bloc and evacuated in Israel's disengagement of 2005. On the day of its evacuation 52 families, over 320 people, lived there.

History
Gan Or was founded in 1980 as an Orthodox moshav by a group of former members of the Bnei Akiva Mizrahi youth group and the Hesder yeshiva program at Netzarim and moved to its current location in 1983. Prior to evacuation the community had built a synagogue and adjacent events hall. The Tohar Girls College there, which was founded in 2000 and offered combined religious studies and academic courses at the Open University and at Bar-Ilan University's campus at nearby Ashkelon, has been relocated.

Unilateral disengagement
Gan Or was officially evacuated on August 18, 2005 by the Israeli Army and Israeli Police, though most of the residents had left earlier. A majority of the families moved to the temporary refuge of Nitzan to which several hundred evacuated families from Gush Katif were relocated.

References

Former Israeli settlements in the Gaza Strip
Populated places established in 1983
Former moshavim
Religious Israeli settlements
Villages depopulated during the Arab–Israeli conflict
1983 establishments in the Palestinian territories